Piroozi  Metro Station is a station of Tehran Metro Line 4. It is located in Piruzi street.

References 

Tehran Metro stations